Jorginho is a Portuguese-language  diminutive name of Jorge, and may refer to:
Jorginho (footballer, born 1924), born Jorge Ceciliano, Brazilian football forward
Jorginho Putinatti (born 1959), born Jorge Antônio Putinatti, Brazilian football midfielder
Jorginho (footballer, born 1964), born Jorge de Amorim Campos, Brazilian international football right-back and current manager
Jorginho (footballer, born 1965), born Jorge Luís da Silva, Brazilian football midfielder and current manager
Jorginho (beach soccer) (born 1974), born Jorge Augusto da Cunha Gabriel, Brazilian beach soccer winger
Jorginho (footballer, born 1975), born Jorge Claudio Conceiçao Rodriguez, Brazilian football midfielder and manager
Jorginho (footballer, born 1977), born Jorge Luiz Pereira de Sousa, Brazilian football forward
Jorginho (footballer, born 1978), born Jorge Manuel Amador Galufo, Portuguese football left-back
Jorginho (footballer, born 1979), born Jorge Luiz de Amorim Silva, Brazilian football striker
Jorginho Paulista (born 1980), born Jorge Henrique Amaral de Castro , Brazilian football left wing-back
Jorginho (footballer, born 1985), born Jorge Pereira da Silva , Brazilian football striker
Jorginho (footballer, born 1988), born Jorge Vinícius Oliveira Alves, Brazilian football forward
Jorginho (footballer, born 5 January 1991), born Jorge de Moura Xavier, Brazilian football attacking midfielder
Jorginho (footballer, born 25 January 1991), born Jorge Mesqueu Neto, Brazilian football midfielder
Jorginho (footballer, born December 1991), born Jorge Luiz Frello Filho, Italian international football midfielder
Jorginho (footballer, born 1993), born Jorge Manuel da Cunha Ribeiro, Portuguese football midfielder
Jorginho James (born 1994), Jamaican international footballer
Jorginho (footballer, born 1995), born Jorge Fernando Barbosa Intima, Bissau-Guinean international winger
Jorginho (footballer, born May 1998), born Jorge Nunes Sampaio, Portuguese football defender
Jorginho (footballer, born June 1998), born Ricardo Jorge Silva Araújo, Portuguese football defender

Portuguese masculine given names